The Crucifixion between Sts. Jerome and Christopher is a painting by the Italian Renaissance master Pinturicchio, painted around 1475 and housed in the Borghese Gallery of Rome, Italy.

It is one of the earliest known works by the Umbrian painter, after some of the panels of the Miracles of St Bernardino (1473).

Description
The work depicts the Crucifixion on a river valley background, whose small details show the influence of Flemish painting. At the sides are a penitent St. Jerome, with the traditional symbols of the tamed lion, the cardinal hat on the ground, and a stone used to hit his chest. On the right is St. Christopher holding the martyrdom palm and looking at the young Jesus on his shoulder. 

The latter, in turn, holds an apple and wears a coif, an element which is present in other early Pinturicchio works, such as the Madonna with Blessing Child in the National Gallery of London. The work shares the same preparatory drawing, and perhaps the cartoon, of a work by Fiorenzo di Lorenzo.

Sources

1470s paintings
Paintings by Pinturicchio
Paintings in the Borghese Collection
Pinturicchio
Lions in art
Paintings of Jerome